Konstantinos Koskinas (born 31 October 1954) is a Greek former swimmer. He competed in the men's 100 metre butterfly at the 1976 Summer Olympics.

References

1954 births
Living people
Greek male swimmers
Olympic swimmers of Greece
Swimmers at the 1976 Summer Olympics
Place of birth missing (living people)
Male butterfly swimmers